Jersey competed in the 2010 Commonwealth Games held in Delhi, India, from 3 to 14 October 2010.

Thirty one athletes were named in the team after original nominees Mariana Agathangelou and Elizabeth Cann elected to compete for England instead.

Aquatics

Swimming

Team Jersey consisted of 1 swimmer.

Ian Black

Archery

Team Jersey consisted of 2 archers.

Micheal Coward, Lucy O'Sullivan

Athletics

Team Jersey consisted of 2 athletes.

Zane Duquemin, Kathryn Rothwell

Badminton

Team Jersey consisted of 2 badminton players.

Kimberley Ashton, Solenn Pasturel

Cycling

Team Jersey consisted of 3 cyclists.

Robin Ovenden, Chris Spence, Richard Tanguy.

Lawn Bowls

Team Jersey consisted of 12 lawn bowls players over 6 events

Men: Cyril Renouf, Derek Boswell, Allan Quernard, Malcolm De Sousa, John Lowery, Michael Rive.
Women: Sue Noel, Christine Grimes, Helen Greechan, Karina Bisson, Rachel Macdonald, Joan Renouf.

Shooting

Team Jersey consisted of 6 shooters.

Bruce Horwood, Daniel Richardson, Steven Le Couilliard, Marc Yates, Andrew De La Haye, Mary Norman.

Squash

Team Jersey consisted of 3 squash players.

Kate Cadigan, Jeannine Cowie, Michael Hopkins.

See also
 Jersey at the 2006 Commonwealth Games

References

2010
Nations at the 2010 Commonwealth Games
Commonwealth Games